Prathipadu mandal is one of the 57 mandals in Guntur district of the Indian state of Andhra Pradesh. It is under the administration of Guntur revenue division and the headquarters are located at Prathipadu.

Villages

References 

Mandals in Guntur district